The Robert Akins House (also known as the Honey House) was a historic house located on Main Street in Berkshire, Tioga County, New York.

Description and history 
It was a Federal style house built in about 1830. It was a two-story, three bay wide, gable-roofed brick structure with a side entrance layout.

It was listed on the National Register of Historic Places on July 2, 1984. Sometime afterwards the house was demolished. On the lot stands a modern prefabricated home.

References

Houses on the National Register of Historic Places in New York (state)
Federal architecture in New York (state)
Houses completed in 1827
Houses in Tioga County, New York
National Register of Historic Places in Tioga County, New York
1827 establishments in New York (state)